Self-portrait without beard is an 1889 oil on canvas painting by the post-impressionist artist Vincent van Gogh. The picture, which may have been Van Gogh's last self-portrait, was painted in September that year. The self-portrait is one of the most expensive paintings of all time, selling for $71.5 million in 1998 in New York City. At the time, it was the third (or an inflation-adjusted fourth) most expensive painting ever sold.

Art historians are divided as to whether this painting or Self-portrait is Van Gogh's final self-portrait. Ronald Pickvance considered this to be the last, while Ingo F. Walther and Jan Hulsker think Self-portrait was the later painting. It was given by van Gogh to his mother as a birthday gift.

Sources

See also
Art movement
Impressionists
Paul Gauguin

1889 paintings
Paintings by Vincent van Gogh
Self-portraits by Vincent van Gogh